František Pospíšil (born April 2, 1944) is a Czech former ice hockey defenceman and coach.

He played in the Czechoslovak Elite League for Poldi Kladno from 1961 to 1978, then in Germany for EV Landshut in 1978–79.  He won the Golden Hockey Stick as the top player in Czechoslovakia in 1971 and 1972.  He scored 134 career goals in 622 league games.

Pospíšil played on the national team from 1967 to 1977, which won the gold medal at the IIHF World Championships in 1972, 1976, and 1977; he was named best defenceman of the tournament in 1972 and 1976.  He also played in the 1972 and 1976 Olympics and the 1976 Canada Cup. At the 1976 Olympics he was proven of having used codeine, which was a banned substance back then.

Pospíšil began coaching in Czechoslovakia in 1979, first with his old team Poldi Kladno from 1979 to 1983 and then with Litvínov from 1983 to 1985. He was assistant coach on the national team between 1986 and 1988.

See also 
Doping at the Olympic Games

References

External links 
 
 Czechoslovakia 1972
 
 
 

1944 births
Czech ice hockey coaches
Czechoslovak ice hockey coaches
Czechoslovak ice hockey defencemen
Czechoslovakia men's national ice hockey team coaches
Doping cases in ice hockey
Rytíři Kladno players
Ice hockey players at the 1968 Winter Olympics
Ice hockey players at the 1972 Winter Olympics
Ice hockey players at the 1976 Winter Olympics
IIHF Hall of Fame inductees
Living people
Medalists at the 1968 Winter Olympics
Medalists at the 1972 Winter Olympics
Medalists at the 1976 Winter Olympics
Olympic bronze medalists for Czechoslovakia
Olympic ice hockey players of Czechoslovakia
Olympic medalists in ice hockey
Olympic silver medalists for Czechoslovakia
People from Kladno District
Sportspeople from the Central Bohemian Region
Czechoslovak expatriate sportspeople in West Germany
Czechoslovak expatriate ice hockey people
Expatriate ice hockey players in West Germany
Czech ice hockey defencemen